Paremhat 25 - Coptic Calendar - Paremhat 27

The twenty-sixth day of the Coptic month of Paremhat, the seventh month of the Coptic year. In common years, this day corresponds to March 22, of the Julian Calendar, and April 4, of the Gregorian Calendar. This day falls in the Coptic Season of Shemu, the season of the Harvest.

Commemorations

Saints 

 The departure of Pope Peter VI, the 104th Patriarch of the See of Saint Mark 
 The departure of Saint Eupraxia the Virgin

References 

Days of the Coptic calendar